Jutaí is a municipality located in the Brazilian state of Amazonas. Its population is 13,886 (2020) and its area is 69,552 km², making it the fifth largest municipality in Amazonas by area and the ninth largest in Brazil.

Conservation

The municipality is in the Juruá-Purus moist forests ecoregion.
It contains parts of the Jutaí-Solimões Ecological Station.
It contains the  Rio Jutaí Extractive Reserve, created in 2002.
The municipality contains the  Cujubim Sustainable Development Reserve, established in 2003.
This is the largest conservation unit in Amazonas and the largest sustainable development reserve in the world.

References

Sources

Municipalities in Amazonas (Brazilian state)